Beenbane is an ancient site and National Monument located in County Kerry, Ireland.

Beenbane is located on the Iveragh Peninsula, to the west of Lough Currane.

Beenbane contains a calluragh, hut sites, cross slab, enclosure, souterrain, cross, boulder burial and standing stones.

References

Buildings and structures in County Kerry
Tourist attractions in County Kerry
National Monuments in County Kerry